Dullipatti is a village, situated in Madhubani district of Bihar, near the Nepal international border. National Highway 105 passes through this village and is 6 kilometers away from Jainagar, sub-division.

As part of Mithilanchal, Maithili is a primary language of the villagers and Hindi is an official language.

Culture 
Villagers belong to different castes and communities. Several types of festivals are celebrated, including Diwali, Chhath, Eid, and Durga Puja.

Education 
This village has two government elementary schools, one government secondary school with a girls hostel facility and one government College D.B. College, LNMU. Beside government schools, there are also privately operated schools.

Banks 
Dullipatti has branches of government banks like Grameen Bank and Indian Overseas Bank.

Energy 
Electricity supply is good and operated by the Bihar Electricity Board. In case of non-supply of electricity, people use generators to produce it.

Migration 
Like other villages of Bihar, some of the people of this village have also migrated to other states, like Delhi, Haryana or Panjab for earning a livelihood. However, due to better job opportunities at home, people are returning.

Business 
Agriculture is the main business of this villagers. All type of foods (wheat, rice, corn, pulse, sugar cane etc.) are being produced without using any dangerous fertilizers due to cultivated land.

Market 
There is a small market located in the center of the village. The larger village of Jainagar is also close to Dullipatti, providing more shopping opportunities.

Road and transport 
Highway (NH-105) that connects this village directly to the main city of the state like Madhubani, Darbhanga, Muzaffarpur and Patna. Buses of Delux and Semi-delux type run through.

Railway connectivity
The Jaynagar railway station is close to this village and can be reached either by personal vehicles or by public transport. There are many JYG trains that depart from this station, to different places of state and country, including Delhi and Calcutta.

Administration 
Mr.Vinay Kumar yadav(king of dullipatti)
Mrs.Rupam Kumari (Mukhiya) and Mrs. Buchhi Devi (Sarpanch)  are  democratically elected representative, takes care of all types of development work in the village.

References

External links 

Dullipatti on Google Map
DULLIPATTI Gram Panchayat    dulipatti-village-panchayat
labour-migration
seismic-survey-cairn-energy-petroleum-reserve
ongcs-exploration-activities-in-the-state-of-bihar
Question raised on ONGC activity in Bihar in Parliament of India
Petroleum Minister of India on Exploration of Natural Product by ONGC
 State Election Commission, Bihar
Dullipatti official website

Cities and towns in Madhubani district